The extant sources for Norse mythology, particularly the Prose and Poetic Eddas, contain many names of jötnar and gýgjar (often glossed as giants and giantesses respectively). While many of them are featured in extant myths of their own, many others have come down to us today only as names in various lists provided for the benefit of skalds or poets of the medieval period and are included here for the purpose of completeness.

List of jötnar

A

B

D

J

K

L

M

N

O

R

S

T

U

V

Y

References

Faulkes, Anthony (transl. and ed.) (1987). Edda (Snorri Sturluson). Everyman. 
Larrington, Carolyne (transl. and ed.) (1996). The Poetic Edda. Oxford World's Classics.

External links
Nafnaþulur in Old Norse

Norse mythology